Zich (also Romanized as Zīch; also known as Zaj-e Tāzehābād and Zīj) is a village in Ghaleh Rural District, Zagros District, Chardavol County, Ilam Province, Iran. At the 2006 census, its population was 48, in 7 families. The village is populated by Kurds.

References 

Populated places in Chardavol County
Kurdish settlements in Ilam Province